Christopher J. Connors (born June 26, 1956) is a New Jersey Republican Party politician, who has served in the Senate since January 8, 2008, where he represents the 9th Legislative District. He served in the General Assembly from January 9, 1990 to January 8, 2008.

Early life 
Born in Ridgewood, New Jersey on June 26, 1956, Connors graduated from Southern Regional High School. He received a B.S. degree in 1978 from Stockton State College (now Stockton University) in Business Administration, an M.P.A. in 1988 from Rutgers University in Public Administration and was awarded a J.D. in 1995 from the Rutgers School of Law - Camden in Camden. He resides in the Forked River section of Lacey Township. Connors is an attorney and is a partner at Dasti, Murphy, McGuckin, Ulaky, Koutsouris & Connors.

Early Political Career 
The son of Leonard T. Connors, he grew up in Surf City, New Jersey and gained his first exposure to politics as a child while helping his father run for city council. He moved to Toms River in 1978 and to Lacey Township four years later, where he was first encouraged to run on his own for elected office. Though initially reluctant to run for election, Connors said that "perhaps the urge to enter politics was a latent kind of urge for me". Connors served on the Lacey Township Committee from 1985 to 1990 and was Mayor of Lacey Township from 1986 to 1989. Connors was Executive Director from 1988 to 1989 and was Deputy Executive Director from 1982 to 1988 of the New Jersey Commission on Capital Budgeting and Planning during the Administration of former Governor Thomas Kean.

New Jersey Assembly 
Connors was elected to the Assembly in 1989 and was sworn in on January 9, 1990. He served as Assistant Majority Leader of the Assembly from 1992 to 1996. He sponsored a law enacted in January 2000 requiring installation of ignition interlock devices in cars of repeat drunk driving offenders and of a 1998 law requiring criminal background checks for nurse aides and home personal care licensing applicants.

New Jersey Senate 
Connors succeeded his father, Leonard T. Connors, who served in the New Jersey Senate from 1982 to 2008.

On January 3, 2023, Connors announced that he would not be a candidate for reelection.

Committees 
Committee assignments for the current session are:
Joint Committee on Housing Affordability
Community and Urban Affairs
Military and Veterans' Affairs

District 9 
Each of the 40 districts in the New Jersey Legislature has one representative in the New Jersey Senate and two members in the New Jersey General Assembly.Each of the 40 districts in the New Jersey Legislature has one representative in the New Jersey Senate and two members in the New Jersey General Assembly. Representatives from the 9th District for the 2022—2023 Legislative Session are:
Senator Christopher J. Connors
Assemblywoman DiAnne Gove
Assemblyman Brian E. Rumpf

Electoral history

Senate

Assembly

References

External links
Senator Christoper Connors's Official Site
Senator Connors' Legislative Website, New Jersey Legislature
New Jersey Legislature financial disclosure forms
2015 2014 2013 2012 2011 2010 2009 2008 2007 2006 2005 2004
Senator Christopher J. Connors, Project Vote Smart

1956 births
Living people
Mayors of places in New Jersey
New Jersey city council members
Republican Party members of the New Jersey General Assembly
Republican Party New Jersey state senators
People from Lacey Township, New Jersey
People from Ridgewood, New Jersey
People from Surf City, New Jersey
People from Toms River, New Jersey
Politicians from Ocean County, New Jersey
Southern Regional High School alumni
Stockton University alumni
Rutgers School of Law–Camden alumni
21st-century American politicians